Dr Paul M. Smith (born 1969) is a British photographer and educator. Deputy Head of School, Media and Performing Arts. BA Hons Photography course within Coventry University Department of Media. In 2001 he was the recipient of the Vic Odden Award from the Royal Photographic Society. MBA and DBA Coventry University.

Life and work
According to Smith's Coventry University profile, he:

His work scrutinises various forms of heroic behaviour. Smith has travelled from 'Soldier' via 'Action Hero' to arrive in his current body of work, the forensic vision of death presented as a new series called 'Impact'.

"Smith's commissioned work includes pieces for Channel 4, Mattersons, and the CD cover for Robbie Williams' Sing When You're Winning."

Publications

In 2004 Goliath published Paul M Smith, Photographs, including work from 1997 to 2004.

Smith's work also appears in Digital Art published by Thames and Hudson, Blink; Phaidon, Porn?; Vision On, and I Am A Camera, and The Saatchi Gallery; Booth-Clibborn.

Awards
2001: Vic Odden Award from the Royal Photographic Society, Bath

References

External links

Coventry University Staff Profile

1969 births
Living people
Academics of Coventry University
Alumni of Coventry University
Alumni of the Royal College of Art
Photographers from Warwickshire